My Boy is the third solo studio album by New Zealand musician Marlon Williams. The album debuted at number one on the Official New Zealand Music Chart.

Production

After the break-up themed Make Way for Love (2018), Williams decided to create a more playful record. In order to distance himself from his pre-established sound and image, Williams worked with a new musical team for My Boy.

The song "Thinking of Nina" is written about the character Nina Sergeevna from the drama series The Americans. The final track of the album is a cover of Barbra Streisand's 1981 single "Promises", which was written by Barry and Robin Gibb of the BeeGees.

Release and promotion

The first single released from the album was "My Boy", in May 2022. The following month, Williams announced the release of the album, paired with the release of the album's second single "Thinking of Nina". Williams toured Europe as an opening act for Lorde's Solar Power Tour in May and June, during which the pair performed songs from Lorde's EP Te Ao Mārama, sung in Māori.

Williams' next singles from the album were "River Rival", released in July, "Easy Does It" in August, and "Don't Go Back", which was released two days before the album. Williams embarked on the My Boy Tour in January 2023, performing four dates across New Zealand.

Track listing

Credits and personnel

Cass Basil – background vocalist (1–3, 6–8, 10–11), bass (1–11), piano (7)
Delaney Davidson – lap steel guitar (2)
Elroy Finn – drums (1, 6)
Hollie Fullbrook – background vocalist (6, 8), cello (10)
Bary Gibb – lyrics (11), composition (11)
Robin Gibb – lyrics (11), composition (11)
Tom Healy – background vocalist (1, 6), baritone guitar (7), drum machine (6, 9), drum programming (3, 10), electric guitar (1–6, 8), engineer (1–11), lap steel guitar (3, 5, 9–10), mixing (1–11), piano (3), percussion (10), producer (1–11), synthesizer (3–5, 7, 11)
Heba Kadry – mastering engineer
Dave Khan – mellotron (2, 7), synthesizer (6), viola (2) violin (2, 6–7)
Mark Perkins – additional production (1, 3–4), background vocalist (1), composer (6), drum programming (3), lyricist (6), synthesizer (3–4)
Paul Taylor – background vocalist (1), drums (2–5, 7–9, 11), percussion (1–9, 11), timpani (11)
Marlon Williams – acoustic guitar (2, 5, 7–9), composer (1–10), electric guitar (3, 5, 7–8), keyboards (1), lyricist (1–10), marimba (5), mellotron (4–5, 8–9, 11), nylon-string guitar (1–2, 4, 6, 9, 11), percussion (9–10), piano (5, 9–11), producer (1–11), synthesizer (3–4, 6–7, 10), wurlitzer organ (8), vocals (1–11)

Charts

Weekly charts

Year-end charts

Release history

References

2022 albums
Dead Oceans albums
Marlon Williams (New Zealand musician) albums